Milanówek  is a town and a seat of a separate commune in Poland. Located next to the Grodzisk Mazowiecki County near Warsaw, it is often considered an outlying suburb of the capital of Poland but is in fact an independent entity administratively and culturally. Milanówek is however part of wider Warsaw agglomeration. Located on the Middle Masovian Plain, between Grodzisk Mazowiecki and Pruszkow, the town has approximately 15,449 inhabitants. Milanówek is served by Milanówek railway station.

History 

Milanówek was established in the late 19th and early 20th century as a result of parceling landbelonging to Michał Lasocki, and lying along the Warsaw-Vienna Railway.

Since the beginning, Milanówek was a summer resort for wealthy residents of Warsaw, who set up lavish summer homes that often, when the owners decided to move permanently, were turned into grand villas. The most famous of the early holiday-makers was Polish writer, Boleslaw Prus. Another permanent resident of the town was sculptor Jan Szczepkowski.

Developed in the interwar period, and still dominant in the older part of town, is some residential architecture. In the 1920s Central Experimental Station of Silk Production was founded.

During World War II, an urn with the heart of Frédéric Chopin, transferred from Holy Cross Church in Krakowskie Przedmieście in Warsaw, was stored in St. Hedwig Church in Milanówek. During the Warsaw Uprising vital organs of Polish Underground State moved to Milanówek and gave the town the nickname "Little London".

In 1951 the town received city rights. In 1961 the city limits were extended, taking over villages including Nowa Wieś (now this part of the city is called Milanowek Kazimierówka). In the communist period there was further development of industry, especially the creation of a factory for surgical and dental instruments: "MIFAMA".

After the administrative reform of 1999, Milanówek became one of the six municipalities forming the district Grodziski.

Monuments 
Monuments of Milanowek include the parish church of St. Hedwig, the "Turczynek" villa, accommodation for soldiers from World War II and many villas built between 1896 - 1945, including "Potęga", "Matulinek", "Hygea", and "Borówka". They are all in the national register of historic monuments (26 items). 388 pre-war villas and other valuable buildings in the middle of Milanowek have been included in the national register of historic monuments.

Sports 
Football club Milan Milanówek was founded in 1986. As of 2021, they compete in the fifth-tier IV liga in the Masovian II group.

Notable residents
Klaudia Alagierska (born 1996), volleyball player
Marek Bieńczyk (born 1956), writer, historian of literature, translator and essayist, winner of Nike Award (2012)
Marek Cieślak (born 1950), speedway rider
Marcin Dorociński (born 1973), film, television and stage actor

Twin towns – sister cities
Milanówek is twinned with:
 Fumone, Italy
 Lidzbark Warmiński, Poland 
 Welzheim, Germany

References

External links
 City Guide on the city official site
 Jewish Community in Milanówek on Virtual Shtetl

Cities and towns in Masovian Voivodeship
Grodzisk Mazowiecki County